Premendra Vishnu Shet is an Indian politician from Goa and a member of the Goa Legislative Assembly. Shet won the Maem Assembly constituency on the Bharatiya Janata Party ticket in the 2022 Goa Legislative Assembly election. Shet defeated Santosh Kumar Sawant of Goa Forward Party by 3136 votes. He is brother of former Goa Legislative Assembly Speaker Anant Shet.

References

1972 births
Living people
Goa MLAs 2022–2027
Bharatiya Janata Party politicians from Goa
Maharashtrawadi Gomantak Party politicians
People from North Goa district